Mary Magdalene is a religious figure in Christianity.

Mary Magdalene may also refer to:

Films
 Mary Magdalene (1914 film), a silent film starring Constance Crawley
 Mary Magdalene (1920 film), a German silent drama starring Eduard von Winterstein
 Mary Magdalene (2018 film), a drama film starring Rooney Mara

Visual arts
 Mary Magdalene (Artemisia Gentileschi), a 1616–18 Italian painting by Artemisia Gentileschi
 Mary Magdalene (Perugino), a c. 1500 Dutch oil on panel painting by Pietro Perugino
 Mary Magdalene (Sandys), a Pre-Raphaelite painting by Frederick Sandys
 Mary Magdalene (Scorel), a c. 1530 Dutch oil on panel painting by Jan van Scorel 
 Mary Magdalene (Stevens), an 1887 painting by Alfred Stevens
 Mary Magdalene (Tzanes), a tempera painting by Konstantinos Tzanes
 Mary Magdalene (Vouet), a 1614–1615 French painting by Simon Vouet

Other uses
 Mary Magdalene (play), a 1910 tragic play by Maurice Maeterlinck
 Mary Magdalene de' Pazzi (1566–1607), saint of the Catholic Church
 "Mary Magdalene", a song by FKA Twigs from Magdalene (2019)
 "Maria Magdalena", a song by Senidah and Surreal from Za Tebe (2022)
 "Marija Magdalena", a song by Doris Dragović from Krajem vijeka (1999)

People with the given names
 Marlene Dietrich or Marie Magdalene Dietrich (1901–1992), German-American actress and singer

See also 
 Maria Maddalena (disambiguation)
 Maria Magdalena (disambiguation)
 Marie-Madeleine (disambiguation)
 Penitent Magdalene (Donatello), an Italian sculpture by Donatello
 St. Mary Magdalene's Church (disambiguation)
 Santa Maria (disambiguation)
 Magdalene (disambiguation)